Terje Simonsen (born April 23, 1963) is a Norwegian historian and nonfiction author. He was among the first to predict the arrival of an androgynous pronoun in Norway.

Early life and education 
Simonsen was born in Norway on April 23, 1963, in the municipality of Kristiansand and raised in the town of Mandal. He graduated from the University of Oslo in 1993. In 2001, his thesis on the Janus journal and Alf Larsen was published by Solum Forlag as a book JANUS—A Journal and an Era.

Career 
In 2003, he wrote an introductory essay to a Norwegian edition of I and Thou by Martin Buber, published by Bokklubben.

In the article “En språklig mutant i anmarsj” (“A Linguistic Mutant Approaching”), published in Morgenbladet, in 2006, Simonsen suggested that gender related changes in culture and society would result in an androgynous pronoun appearing through an evolutionary process resembling natural evolution.

Simonsen’s main interest has been esoteric traditions—hermeticism, kabbalah, sufism etc.—and he has also edited and authored writings within this field. Among other things, he instigated the first Norwegian translation and edition of the antique esoteric text Book of Enoch in the series Verdens Hellige Skrifter ("The World’s Holy Scriptures"), where he also wrote an introductory essay.

In 2013, Simonsen authored a book on parapsychology, where he explored various paranormal phenomena in a historical context as well as the evolution of the intellectual foundations of parapsychology. In 2018, an expanded and updated English edition was published by an Italian company Pari Publishing. In November 2019, it received the Parapsychological Association Book Award. A new edition was released in the United Kingdom and United States in 2020 by Watkins Publishing (2020).
| In 2013, Simonsen authored a book on parapsychology in Norwegian, where he explored various paranormal phenomena in a historical context as well as the evolution of the intellectual foundations of parapsychology. It was published in English as Our Secret Powers—A Short History of (Nearly) Everything Paranormal (Pari Publishing, 2018) and Czech (Nakladatelství Prah, 2021). In November 2019, the book received the Parapsychological Association Book Award. The following year an upgraded English edition was released under the title A Short History of (Nearly) Everything Paranormal - Our Secret powers: Telepathy, Clairvoyance and Precognition (Watkins Publishing, 2020).

Publications

References

External links
 

1963 births
Living people
20th-century Norwegian non-fiction writers
21st-century Norwegian male writers
20th-century Norwegian historians
21st-century non-fiction writers
Norwegian science writers
People from Kristiansand
University of Oslo alumni
21st-century Norwegian historians
Male non-fiction writers